Blair is a city in Trempealeau County, Wisconsin, along the Trempealeau River. The population was 1,366 at the 2010 census.

Blair is on the former Green Bay and Western Railroad, which ran down the Trempealeau River valley to Winona, Minnesota.

History

The city was first settled during the 1850s. The majority of the city's population are descended from Norwegian settlers, with a smaller group descended from German settlers. The city's Norwegian heritage is represented by annual lefse and lutefisk suppers at the churches and a love of polka music. A lefse company is located in Blair.

The city's name was changed from Porterville in 1873 when the Green Bay and Western Railroad was routed through the city. The new name of Blair came from one of the railroad's chief investors, John Insley Blair. At one time, during the heyday of railroads, a branch line connected the GB&W with the nearby village of Ettrick, although it was later abandoned. The railroad continues to operate, although under a different name.

The city has avoided the fate of some small towns in the Midwest which slowly lost population due to young people leaving for jobs elsewhere. The population of Blair nearly doubled in the years between 1950 and 2000. During the 1950s and earlier annual floods during the snow melt were often experienced, but better farming techniques now make flooding rare. More recently, a number of Amish farming families have settled in the area and their horse-drawn carriages are sometimes seen on the roads.

Geography

Two highways connect to the city: Highway 53, a north-south route, and Highway 95, an east-west route. The closest large cities are Eau Claire to the north and La Crosse to the south. Whitehall, the county seat, is seven miles away. The rural area surrounding Blair is in the Town of Preston. Nearby communities include Taylor, Arcadia, Independence, Hixton, and Galesville.

The Trempealeau River near Blair was dammed to create Lake Henry, named after one of the first settlers.

Blair is in the Driftless Area, which was undisturbed by the last great glacial flow over North America. The area is also known as the Coulee Region, characterized by rolling hills. The forested hills are favored by deer hunters. Pheasants and grouse are also hunted. Local streams are fished for trout, which are stocked.

Climate
The Köppen Climate Classification subtype for this climate is "Dfb" (Warm Summer Continental Climate).

Demographics

2010 census
As of the census of 2010, there were 1,366 people, 571 households, and 319 families residing in the city. The racial makeup of the city was 96.6% White, 0.4% African American, 0.2% Native American, 0.1% Asian, 1.3% from other races, and 1.4% from two or more races. Hispanic or Latino of any race were 3.8% of the population.

There were 571 households, of which 30.1% had children under the age of 18 living with them, 41.2% were married couples living together, 8.9% had a female householder with no husband present, 5.8% had a male householder with no wife present, and 44.1% were non-families. 37.3% of all households were made up of individuals, and 18.1% had someone living alone who was 65 years of age or older. The average household size was 2.27 and the average family size was 2.97.

The median age in the city was 41.1 years. 24.1% of residents were under the age of 18; 6.7% were between the ages of 18 and 24; 23.8% were from 25 to 44; 22.7% were from 45 to 64; and 22.5% were 65 years of age or older. The gender makeup of the city was 47.1% male and 52.9% female.

2000 census
As of the census of 2000, there were 1,273 people, 533 households, and 305 families residing in the city. The population density was 1,175.2 people per square mile (455.1/km2). There were 564 housing units at an average density of 520.7 per square mile (201.6/km2). The racial makeup of the city was 98.51% White, 0.24% African American, 0.16% Native American, 0.08% Asian, 0.55% from other races, and 0.47% from two or more races. Hispanic or Latino of any race were 1.34% of the population.

There were 533 households, out of which 24.8% had children under the age of 18 living with them, 46.9% were married couples living together, 6.8% had a female householder with no husband present, and 42.6% were non-families. 37.9% of all households were made up of individuals, and 21.2% had someone living alone who was 65 years of age or older. The average household size was 2.21 and the average family size was 2.92.

In the city, the population was spread out, with 21.7% under the age of 18, 7.1% from 18 to 24, 24.4% from 25 to 44, 18.2% from 45 to 64, and 28.5% who were 65 years of age or older. The median age was 42 years. For every 100 females, there were 85.0 males. For every 100 females age 18 and over, there were 85.7 males.

The median income for a household in the city was $30,769, and the median income for a family was $41,292. Males had a median income of $27,297 versus $20,750 for females. The per capita income for the city was $16,253. About 3.3% of families and 9.6% of the population were below the poverty line, including 13.2% of those under age 18 and 14.4% of those age 65 or over.

Economy
Blair has a bank and a Dollar General store, also a Kwik-Trip. The local post office provides box service only. The local newspaper used to be The Blair Press.until it closed in 2019 when the owner died. The city's creamery, operated by the Associated Milk Producers, processes milk and produces cheese. In the past, Colby cheese was a staple, distributed by the Kraft company. The city's largest employers are the Public schools, Sand Mines, AMPI, and Grandview a Nursing home. Blair is also home to Countryside Lefse Company.

Culture
The local festival is the Cheese Fest, which takes place annually in mid-September. A city park and municipal swimming pool are located along Lake Henry. Blair has two Lutheran churches and one Catholic church.

Images

References

External links

 City of Blair
 Sanborn fire insurance maps: 1903 1914
"Blair Press https://www.wnanews.com/2019/02/13/blair-press-building-sale/

Cities in Wisconsin
Cities in Trempealeau County, Wisconsin